The S&P/TSX 60 Index is a stock market index of 60 large companies listed on the Toronto Stock Exchange. Maintained by the Canadian S&P Index Committee, a unit of Standard & Poor's, it exposes the investor to nine industry sectors. 

Combined with the S&P/TSX Completion Index it forms the S&P/TSX Composite Index.

The S&P/TSX 60 Index is designed to represent leading companies in leading industries. Its 60 stocks make it ideal for coverage of companies with large market capitalizations and a cost-efficient way to achieve Canadian equity exposure. The S&P/TSX 60 Index also represents the Canadian component of Standard & Poor's flagship S&P Global 1200. The S&P/TSX 60 Index was launched on December 30, 1998.

Constituents 
As of October 12, 2022 the constituents were:

Sector weights
The weighting of the Global Industry Classification Standard (GICS) as of October 12, 2022 are:

TSX 60-based funds
The iShares S&P/TSX 60 Index Fund and the Horizons S&P/TSX 60 Index ETF are Canadian exchange-traded index funds that are tied to the S&P/TSX 60.

See also
 S&P/TSX Composite Index
 List of companies listed on the Toronto Stock Exchange
 S&P Global 1200
 TSX Venture 50
Jantzi Social Index

References

External links
 S&P/TSX 60 index at Toronto Stock Exchange
 S&P/TSX 60 index at S&P Dow Jones Indices
 Bloomberg page for SPTSX60:IND

 
Canadian stock market indices
S&P Dow Jones Indices